Baker Ridge is a ridge extending west for  from the northern part of the Washington Escarpment in the Neptune Range, Pensacola Mountains. It was mapped by the United States Geological Survey from surveys and from U.S. Navy air photos, 1956–66, and named by the Advisory Committee on Antarctic Names for Clifford E. Baker, an aviation electronics technician at Ellsworth Station, winter 1958.

References 

Ridges of Queen Elizabeth Land